Fumiko Shinpo is a former international table tennis player from Japan.

Table tennis career
She won a silver medal for Japan at the 1983 World Table Tennis Championships in the Corbillon Cup (women's team event) with Mika Hoshino, Tomoko Tamura and Emiko Kanda.

She won two Asian Games medals in 1974 and 1978.

See also
 List of World Table Tennis Championships medalists

References

Living people
Japanese female table tennis players
Asian Games medalists in table tennis
Table tennis players at the 1974 Asian Games
Table tennis players at the 1978 Asian Games
Medalists at the 1974 Asian Games
Medalists at the 1978 Asian Games
Asian Games bronze medalists for Japan
World Table Tennis Championships medalists
Year of birth missing (living people)